Cubalaskeya nivea is a species of sea snail, a gastropod in the family Cerithiopsidae. It was described by Faber, in 2007.

References

 Faber (2007). Miscellanea Malacologica 2 (4) : 79-83

Cerithiopsidae
Gastropods described in 2007